Brad Clark (born 1960) is a Canadian politician in Ontario, Canada. He was the councillor in Ward nine in Hamilton, Ontario from December 2006 to December 2014. He was a Progressive Conservative member of the Legislative Assembly of Ontario from 1999 to 2003, and was a cabinet minister in the governments of Mike Harris and Ernie Eves. In the 2018 municipal elections he again won councillor in Ward nine in Hamilton Ontario defeating Doug Conley.

Background
Clark was educated at Mohawk College in Hamilton, receiving a diploma in radio broadcasting. He owned and operated a small business after his graduation, and also served as executive director of the Songwriters Association of Canada. In June 2004, Clark began co-hosting a weekly program on aging on CHML radio.

Politics
In the provincial election of 1999, he ran as the Progressive Conservative candidate in the suburban Hamilton riding of Stoney Creek. He defeated Liberal candidate Chris Phillips by about 2,500 votes.  On February 8, 2001, he was appointed as the province's Minister of Transportation.  When Ernie Eves succeeded Mike Harris as Premier on April 15, 2002, he named Clark as his Minister of Labour.

Clark was initially favoured for re-election in the provincial election of 2003 against Liberal candidate Tony Magnini. Magnini was forced to resign in mid-campaign amid allegations of fraud, however, and the Liberals were able to convince Jennifer Mossop, a popular local journalist, to take his place. She defeated Clark by over 5,000 votes. In 2004, he endorsed Frank Klees's bid to lead the Ontario Progressive Conservatives.

On November 13, 2006, Clark beat out incumbent city councillor Phil Bruckler by a narrow margin for a seat on the Hamilton City Council to represent Ward 9, which includes the mountain and heritage areas of Stoney Creek. In the federal election of 2011 Clark ran against and was defeated by NDP incumbent Wayne Marston in the riding of Hamilton East—Stoney Creek.  He did not step down from council when running for this political position.

In the Hamilton Municipal Election of 2014, Clark ran for the mayoralty of the city. He placed second, being defeated by former Hamilton Mayor Fred Eisenberger. This ended his term as a city councillor when the new council was sworn in late in December 2014.

Cabinet positions

References

External links 
 

1960 births
Hamilton, Ontario city councillors
Living people
Members of the Executive Council of Ontario
Progressive Conservative Party of Ontario MPPs
21st-century Canadian politicians